is a song performed by South Korean girl group Kara. It was released as the fourth Japanese single on June 29, 2011 but was earlier released digitally on iTunes Japan on June 22, 2011. 
It was released in four different versions, three limited editions and one regular edition.

The single went to sell over 100,000 copies during its first week becoming their second Japanese single to do so after "Jet Coaster Love", which sold 123,000 copies during its first week. It was certified Gold by the RIAJ in June 2011 for selling over 100,000 physical copies. The song earned their first nomination for "Best Song Award" at the Japan Record Awards. A 2012 version of the song was released as a digital single on July 25, 2012.

Background 

Rumors of a fourth Japanese single first surfaced when the group was spotted leaving the Incheon International Airport and were said to be bound for Thailand to film a music video or a commercial. Despite the rumors, no official announcements or comments were made by DSP Media. On May 25, 2011, DSP Media officially announced that Kara will be releasing their fourth Japanese single in late June and will be leaving for previously arranged promotions in early June. On June 1, 2011, it was announced the group was chosen by LG as the endorser for the cellphone brand "Optimus Bright" (a Japanese variant of Optimus Black) and the single was used in the commercial for the brand.

The 2012 Version was used for Live Dam's karaoke system "Furikara". This version remains its original lyrics but with a different electronic instrumental. It was later included in their compilation album  Kara Collection (2012) and their third Japanese album Girls Forever (2012). A Korean Version was performed on August 18, 2014, on the Day & Night showcase. It was also performed on May 26, 2015, on the In Love showcase.

Composition
The B-side "Girls Be Ambitious" was used for promoting DARIYA's hair dye product line "Palty". "To Me" (originally titled "2Me") was included as a bonus track for the Regular CD Only First Press Edition. It is a Korean song previously released on the single "We Online OST Part 2" in South Korea and used for promoting the online game "We Online: Secret Expedition."

Commercial performance 
The single has sold over 100,000 copies during its first week, following their third single, "Jet Coaster Love", which sold 123,000 copies during its first week making it the group's second single most successful single. It was certified gold by the RIAJ in June 2011 for physical copies shipped to stores. It currently holds the record for the best selling single by a foreign female artist. The single has also performed well digitally as it has topped the Recochoku's monthly chart of July, as well as topping 4 other charts in 'Ringtone', 'Full Version Ringtones', 'Video Clip', and 'Callback Tone' earning the group a Recochoku  Award. It also took 2nd place on the 'Waiting Call Tone'. It has also topped Mora, Musico, Music Japan, and other major record charts.

Music video and promotion 
On May 13, 2011, it was reported that Kara was set to film a music video for their upcoming Japanese single due to be released sometime in June. The music video was said to be filmed in Phuket, Thailand and the group was spotted leaving the Incheon International Airport during that day. A teaser of the music video was released on Universal Music Japan's YouTube channel on June 15, 2011. The full music video premiered the following day at Space Shower TV on June 16, 2011.

The group made their first live performance at TV Asahi's Music Station on June 17, 2011, where they performed a special medley with their previous single, "Jet Coaster Love". The group made another appearance on the show the following week on June 24, 2011, where they only performed the single. On June 26, 2011, the group appeared on Music Japan and performed the song. The group made an appearance on Count Down TV on July 3, 2011, where they were placed at #1 for the Recochoku "Chaku Uta ®" Top 10 chart.

Track listing

Charts

Weekly charts

Year-end charts

Sales and certifications

Release history

References

External links
 

2011 singles
Dance-pop songs
Japanese-language songs
Kara (South Korean group) songs
RIAJ Digital Track Chart number-one singles